Elizabeth Auguste Marie Florestine Luise, Princess of Urach and Countess of Württemberg (born 23 August 1894 at Lichtenstein Castle (Württemberg); died 13 October 1962 in Frauenthal castle in Styria) was the wife of Prince Karl Aloys of Liechtenstein.

Life 

Elizabeth was the second daughter of Duke Wilhelm Karl of Urach (1864–1928) and his first wife Duchess Amalie in Bavaria (1865–1912). After the death of her mother in May 1912, she managed the housekeeping of her father's home and looked after the education of her younger siblings.

Prince Joachim of Prussia (1890–1920), the youngest son of Emperor Wilhelm II courted her in vain. Elizabeth and her father rejected him because he was a Protestant and they insisted on educating children according to catholicism.

During World War I Elizabeth corresponded with her father, who had the rank of a lieutenant general and was commander of the 26th Division in France, Russia and Serbia. Their letters are now in the main governmental archive in Stuttgart.

In spring 1921 she married Prince Karl Aloys of Liechtenstein (1878–1955), a son of Prince Alfred and Princess Henriette. Prince Karl Aloys was Imperial and Royal Cavalry Master (Rittmeister) until the end of the monarchy of Austria-Hungary and from 13 December 1918 to 15 September 1920 temporarily Prime Minister (Landesverweser) of the Principality of Liechtenstein.

They had four children:

 Wilhelm Alfred (1922-2006).
 Maria Josepha (1923-2005).
 Franziska (1930-2006).
 Wolfgang (born 1934).

She found her last resting place in the burial vault of Vaduz Cathedral.

Literature 
 Wolfgang Schmierer: Article on Elisabeth, Prinzessin von und zu Liechtenstein [nee Fürstin von Urach]. In: Das Haus Württemberg. Ein biographisches Lexikon, editor: Sönke Lorenz, Dieter Mertens und Volker Press, Kohlhammer Verlag, Stuttgart 1997, S. 391.

References 

1894 births
1962 deaths
Countesses of Württemberg
Princesses of Urach